Treed usually means:
 covered in trees
 chased up a tree, see treeing

Treed may also refer to:
 "Treed", a title of the English-language version of "True Love Awakens: The Makai Tree's Secret", an episode of Sailor Moon R
 Treed, a play by Hal Corley

See also
 Treed Murray, a 2001 Canadian film